Kaona may refer to:

 Kaona (Kučevo), a village in the municipality of Kučevo, Serbia
 Kaona (Lučani), a village in the municipality of Lučani, Serbia
 Kaona (Vladimirci), a village in the municipality of Vladimirci, Serbia